Orocrambus geminus is a moth in the family Crambidae. It was described by Brian H. Patrick in 1991. It is endemic to New Zealand. The species has been recorded in Central Otago. The habitat consists of wet low alpine areas.

References

Crambinae
Moths described in 1991
Moths of New Zealand
Endemic fauna of New Zealand
Endemic moths of New Zealand